JumpStart 1st Grade (known as Jump Ahead Year 1 in the United Kingdom) is a personal computer game created by Knowledge Adventure in 1995 intended to teach a first grade curriculum. It was reissued in 1999 with new box art, was updated significantly in 2000, and was replaced with JumpStart Advanced 1st Grade in 2002, which was later replaced with JumpStart 3D Virtual World: Trouble in Town. The original 1995 version (also referred to as the Classic Version) was the first appearance of Frankie, a brown, anthropomorphic dachshund dog who would go on to become the mascot of the JumpStart series.

Gameplay
The 1995 version of the game consisted of an interactive schoolhouse full of educational activities, songs, and the like, with Frankie the school mascot in charge of guiding the player around. Playing activities earned points, which could eventually be traded in for milk cap rewards. The classic version contains the voiceover and singing talents of Mark Beckwith of Razzle Bam Boom and Glynnis Talken Campbell including the songs JumpStart First Grade, Vegetable ABCs, If You Were My Friend, Reading is Fun, Zero is Nothing, My Week at Sea, and Frankie's Theme Song.

The 2000 version was based on a similar concept with Frankie taking on a more student-like role, and picking the player to be his partner in the school treasure hunt. Playing games now earned the player clues to help find the treasure. The four areas are a classroom, a cafeteria, field trips, and a playground. The player earns 100 points to earn a milk cap. There are 30 math caps in green, 30 reading caps in red, 20 nature caps in blue, and 20 time caps in yellow.

Reception
A reviewer from Superkids recommended the game for younger players, who would not become bored from the repetitive tasks and activities.

References

External links
 (2000 version)

1995 video games
JumpStart
Children's educational video games
School-themed video games
Windows games
Classic Mac OS games
Video games developed in the United States
Video games about dogs
Single-player video games